Ion Cavași (born 5 November 1953) is a Romanian alpine skier. He competed in three events at the 1976 Winter Olympics.

References

External links
 

1953 births
Living people
Romanian male alpine skiers
Olympic alpine skiers of Romania
Alpine skiers at the 1976 Winter Olympics
People from Breaza